The 2020 PDC Players Championship was to consist of 30 darts tournaments on the 2020 PDC Pro Tour. However, after only 8 events had taken place, the COVID-19 pandemic decimated the schedule.

In the end, three Super Series events (dubbed the "Summer Series", "Autumn Series" and "Winter Series") took place behind closed doors.

Prize money
The prize money for the Players Championship events remained at 2020 levels, with each event having a prize fund of £75,000.
This is how the prize money is divided:

February

Players Championship 1
Players Championship 1 was contested on Saturday 8 February 2020 at the Barnsley Metrodome in Barnsley.  and  hit nine-dart finishes against  and  respectively.

Players Championship 2
Players Championship 2 was contested on Sunday 9 February 2020 at the Barnsley Metrodome in Barnsley. ,  and  hit nine-dart finishes against ,  and  respectively.

Players Championship 3
Players Championship 3 was contested on Saturday 15 February 2020 at the Robin Park Tennis Centre in Wigan.  and  hit nine-dart finishes against  and  respectively.

Players Championship 4
Players Championship 4 was contested on Sunday 16 February 2020 at the Robin Park Tennis Centre in Wigan.

Players Championship 5
Players Championship 5 was contested on Saturday 22 February 2020 at the Robin Park Tennis Centre in Wigan.  hit a nine-dart finish against .

Players Championship 6
Players Championship 6 was contested on Sunday 23 February 2020 at the Robin Park Tennis Centre in Wigan.  hit a nine-dart finish against .

March

Players Championship 7
Players Championship 7 was contested on Saturday 14 March 2020 at the Barnsley Metrodome in Barnsley.

Players Championship 8
Players Championship 8 was contested on Sunday 15 March 2020 at the Barnsley Metrodome in Barnsley.

July (Summer Series)

Players Championship 9
Players Championship 9 (also known as Summer Series Day One) was contested on Wednesday 8 July 2020 at the Marshall Arena in Milton Keynes.

Players Championship 10
Players Championship 10 (also known as Summer Series Day Two) was contested on Thursday 9 July 2020 at the Marshall Arena in Milton Keynes.

Players Championship 11
Players Championship 11 (also known as Summer Series Day Three) was contested on Friday 10 July 2020 at the Marshall Arena in Milton Keynes.

Players Championship 12
Players Championship 12 (also known as Summer Series Day Four) was contested on Saturday 11 July 2020 at the Marshall Arena in Milton Keynes.  hit a nine-dart finish against .

Players Championship 13
Players Championship 13 (also known as Summer Series Day Five) was contested on Sunday 12 July 2020 at the Marshall Arena in Milton Keynes.  hit a nine-dart finish against .

September (Autumn Series)

Players Championship 14
Players Championship 14 (also known as Autumn Series Day One) was contested on Saturday 12 September 2020 at the H+ Hotel in Niedernhausen.  hit a nine-dart finish against .

Players Championship 15
Players Championship 15 (also known as Autumn Series Day Two) was contested on Sunday 13 September 2020 at the H+ Hotel in Niedernhausen.

Players Championship 16
Players Championship 16 (also known as Autumn Series Day Three) was contested on Monday 14 September 2020 at the H+ Hotel in Niedernhausen.

Players Championship 17
Players Championship 17 (also known as Autumn Series Day Four) was contested on Tuesday 15 September 2020 at the H+ Hotel in Niedernhausen.

Players Championship 18
Players Championship 18 (also known as Autumn Series Day Five) was contested on Wednesday 16 September 2020 at the H+ Hotel in Niedernhausen.  hit a nine-dart finish against .

November (Winter Series)

Players Championship 19
Players Championship 19 (also known as Winter Series Day One) was contested on Tuesday 10 November 2020 at the Ricoh Arena in Coventry.

Players Championship 20
Players Championship 20 (also known as Winter Series Day Two) was contested on Wednesday 11 November 2020 at the Ricoh Arena in Coventry.  and  hit nine-dart finishes against  and  respectively.

Players Championship 21
Players Championship 21 (also known as Winter Series Day Three) was contested on Thursday 12 November 2020 at the Ricoh Arena in Coventry.  hit a nine-dart finish against .

Players Championship 22
Players Championship 22 (also known as Winter Series Day Four) was contested on Friday 13 November 2020 at the Ricoh Arena in Coventry.

Players Championship 23
Players Championship 23 (also known as Winter Series Day Five) was contested on Saturday 14 November 2020 at the Ricoh Arena in Coventry.

References

2020 in darts
2020 PDC Pro Tour